Pendaflex is a maker of office filing products headquartered in Melville, NY, USA.

Pendaflex is a wholly owned subsidiary of TOPS Products

Company history

1882–1909: the early years
The company was founded in Manhattan in 1882 by brothers Charles S. Jonas and Richard A. Jonas. Their company, Charles S. Jonas and Brother, first operated in the niche field of paper ruling, where they provided the service of ruling lines on paper for customers.

After the turn of the century, businesses started to utilize filing systems with index cards and file folders. Thus began Charles S. Jonas and Brother first venture into manufacturing their own items. The product line was at first limited to index cards and guides, and gradually expanded, with sales covering a larger territory. The company was renamed Record Card Company in 1909, as a reflection of their new manufacturing endeavor.

1918–1939: new product development
In 1918, the Record Card Company first registered Oxford as a brand name. The success of the Oxford brand led the company to change its name in 1921 to the Oxford Filing Supply Company. The firm continued to specialize in filing supplies, introducing many new items which contributed to the growth of the filing industry. In 1939, the company began making expanding envelopes and introduced the convenience of file folder labels in rolls, as well as corrugated board transfer files in a drawer style. The company's most significant advance, however, was the Oxford Pendaflex hanging file folder. This was the now familiar filing pouch that hooked over the sides of a file drawer. Smaller files placed inside the hanging file allowed the drawer to be easily subdivided. The company called its Pendaflex hanging file the greatest development in filing since the evolution of the filing folder.

1940–1968: U.S. expansion
Oxford Filing Supply gradually expanded its operations beyond the New York City area, establishing a Midwestern base in the 1930s, with a factory in St. Louis. Its main plant moved in 1948 from Brooklyn to Garden City, New York. The company built a West Coast manufacturing facility in 1953 in Los Angeles, and the St. Louis and Los Angeles plants were expanded several times in the 1960s. Also during this time, the company opened new facilities in Augusta, Georgia, and in East Rutherford, New Jersey, while establishing an equipment division in Long Island, which later moved to larger quarters in Moonachie, New Jersey.

1969–1975: international expansion
Oxford Filing Supply Company changed its name in 1969 to reflect its leading brand, and the company became the Oxford Pendaflex Corporation. 1972, Pendaflex introduced the color-coded system of filing. Business continued to grow, and, during the early 1970s, Oxford Pendaflex expanded its New Jersey, Missouri, Georgia, and California facilities. By 1976, the company had subsidiaries in Mexico, Costa Rica, and Venezuela, employed a work force of 1,200, and had a marketing organization supplying approximately 5,500 dealers and 60 wholesalers across the United States and Canada.

1976–1978: the takeover
The company's comprehensive North American marketing organization was an attractive asset, and, in 1976, the Swedish office supply firm Esselte AB made a lucrative offer for Oxford Pendaflex. Oxford Pendaflex shares had been trading on the New York Stock Exchange for between $13 and $14 a share, and Esselte offered $23 a share to take over the American company. The two companies announced an agreement in March 1976, and Oxford Pendaflex became part of the Swedish company's Esselte Business Systems group. Esselte was a much larger firm than Oxford Pendaflex, with 1975 sales of approximately $350 million, compared to an estimated $60 million for the American firm. Esselte had positioned itself as one of the world's leading companies in office equipment, and it was willing to pay a high price for Oxford Pendaflex in order to gain access to the American and Canadian market.

Sales grew in the years after the take over, reaching close to $75 million by 1978. That year Oxford Pendaflex, backed by parent company Esselte, took over the California company Dymo Industries, which was well known for its Dymotape labeling equipment. Dymo had revenues of close to $210 million, and more than half of its sales came from foreign operations. Esselte AB already distributed some of the Dymo line in Europe, and it paid out $43.5 million for the company. Although Dymo initially resisted the takeover, by July 1978 Oxford Pendaflex controlled 94 percent of Dymo's stock. Oxford took over the Dymo product lines, which included Ideal accounting books and the Sten-C-Labl addressing system in addition to Dymotape.

1979–1989: growth through acquisition
The next year, Oxford Pendaflex changed its name to Esselte Pendaflex Corporation and continued to expand through acquisitions. In 1981, Esselte Pendaflex took over the operation of its parent's U.S. price marking division by integrating with the Esselte subsidiary Esselte Meto. Esselte Meto had been formed out of the price marking operations of Dymo and that of a 1980 acquisition, Primark. The company's next major addition was the Boorum & Pease Company in 1985. Boorum & Pease, based in Elizabeth, New Jersey, manufactured and marketed office supplies, record-keeping supplies, and information storage and retrieval products, and was a leading manufacturer of blank books and loose-leaf binders. The company had revenues of $70 million in 1985, and Esselte Pendaflex paid $40 million for it. That year, Esselte Pendaflex also acquired a Los Angeles firm called Universal Paper Goods. This company had a West Coast business manufacturing custom order folders and office supplies.

Esselte Business Systems, of which Esselte Pendaflex was a division, continued to pursue growth through acquisition. The company bought up nine firms in 1987 alone, with total combined annualized sales of around $85 million. The three divisions of Esselte Business Systems, which included Esselte Pendaflex for office supplies, a division specializing in graphic arts supplies, and a retail supply division, posted record sales and profits in 1987. Esselte Pendaflex also named a new
president that year, Theodor e V. Kachel.

1990–1995: the decline
In the early 1990s, however, the U.S. market for office supplies weakened significantly. Parent company Esselte AB was forced to institute a stringent cost-cutting plan that included large bouts of lay-offs in 1990 and 1991, in order to make up for the deteriorating market conditions in the United States, as well as in some European markets. Sales for Esselte Pendaflex dropped off steeply between 1989 and 1990, and revenue remained relatively static over the next few years. Operating income also shrank drastically between 1989 and 1990, and in 1993 the company posted a loss.

The company's difficulties were attributed in part to changes in the North American office supply market overall. Distribution became more concentrated as stores consolidated through mergers and acquisitions and new superstores became more important players. Competition was intense between the large distributors, and prices overall were forced down. By 1993, Esselte Pendaflex had a smaller pool of customers than in past years, though the customers on the whole were larger. Another change in the market lay in the declining number of white collar workers within major corporations. And though more people were working from their homes, with an estimated 39 million home offices in 1992, this did not altogether offset the loss of corporate workers.
 
Esselte Pendaflex was aware of these changing conditions and took steps to keep pace. However, the company's operating costs were very high in the early 1990s, and many of its products had low profit margins. This led to a disappointing drop in income. The company appointed a new divisional president in April 1993, Alan Wood. His mission was to reorganize the company for cost efficiency. Esselte Pendaflex expected to make major transitions through 1993 and 1994.

1995–present: new beginnings
Despite recent changes in the market, the company still saw opportunity for growth and predicted improved profitability over the coming years. On July 11, 2002, the private equity investment firm, J.W. Childs, announced that it had decided to implement its public offer to the shareholders of Esselte/Pendaflex. The purchase price for Esselte was SEK 90 per share, equivalent to SEK 3,100 million (appr. $330 million). The change in ownership of Esselte provided a number of strong benefits to the company. The foremost among these was greater financial flexibility to pursue an aggressive, growth oriented strategy that included new product development and design in all product categories.

The J.W. Childs acquisition also brought with it a lean management system philosophy that bases manufacturing runs and procurement on what it sells. Pendaflex expects to reduce work-in-process inventory by 50% or more, and ultimately turn over finished goods inventory every month.

In 2014, RR Donnelley acquired all of the North American operations of Esselte. In 2016, RR Donnelley spun-off its office products business as LSC Communications. LSC Communications currently offers its Oxford, Pendaflex and Ampad products through its subsidiary division TOPS Office Products.

Technology and products 

Pendaflex makes general filing products and filing supplies, labeling systems and supplies, report covers and portfolios, bound books, binders and loose-leaf supplies, plastic office accessories, and document binding systems and supplies. Approximately 90 percent of the company's products are manufactured at the company's own production facilities in Missouri; Los Angeles, California, and other U.S. cities, as well as in Toronto, Canada. Pendaflex markets primarily in the United States and Canada, though its presence in the Mexican market is increasing. A small percentage of the company's sales include exports to the Caribbean, South and Central America, the Middle East, and Asia.

Environmentally friendly filing
In 1990, Pendaflex launched Earthwise recycled filing supplies, a complete line of environmentally friendly products.

Products and technology associated with the Environmentally Friendly Filing line include:
 File Folders
 Hanging Folders
 File Pockets
 File Wallets

Mobile Office File
In 2000, Pendaflex introduced a new product called the Pendaflex Mobile File. The mobile file was developed for consumers who carry documents from one place to another - it is durable and water resistant.

Hanging file folders
In February 2004, Pendaflex released another new product line, an update to the original hanging file folder, called Pendaflex Ready-Tab Hanging Folders. This product added pre-installed tabs across the top of the hanging folders.

Desktop organization
In September 2006, Pendaflex launched its line of “PileSmart" products. After extensive research, Pendaflex discovered that half of office workers would rather pile documents than file them. This led to the development of filing system products that would allow workers to keep piling – in an organized fashion.

Products and technology associated with the PileSmart Desktop Organization line include:
 Desktop Organizer Tray
 Binder Label Clips
 Label Clips
 View Folders
 View Folders with Tabs
 Quickview Jackets
 Project Sorters

Pendaflex Online Learning Center 
On March 19, 2003, Pendaflex launched the Pendaflex Learning Center, an online education source that educates consumers on organizational techniques and systems. Pendaflex Learning Centers teaches users office essentials such as Microsoft Word, Excel and PowerPoint, and offers in-depth courses on critical topics such as starting, marketing, managing and growing a business.

I Hate Filing Club 
In 1986, Pendaflex launched the “I Hate Filing Club” for administrative professionals who dislike filing. An online version of the I Hate Filing Club was introduced in 1999.

Members of the I Hate Filing Club communicate with their peers and share organizational ideas in the online community through a community message board, a monthly “Keeping Tabs” newsletter and by interacting with Club President, Sharon Mann in the “Ask Sharon” forum.

The I Hate Filing Club has over 100,000 members.

The Pendaflex Administrative Professional Hall of Fame
In 2005, I Hate Filing Club members were invited to nominate employees, coworkers or friends for the prestigious “Administrative Professional of the Year” title. Nominating essays were judged by the President of the International Association of Administrative Professionals (IAAP), the President of National Association of Professional Organizers (NAPO) and a team of Pendaflex executives. The winner received a spa vacation for two in Arizona and a $4,000 stipend, along with a golden PENDY, a fresh bouquet of flowers every month for a year and Pendaflex organizational products, including the Project Sorter, Mobile File and Get-A-Grip Expanding File.

Environmental record 
In the early 1990s, Pendaflex developed a line of products made from 100% recycled papers. This product line, called Earthwise, was the first line of filing supplies to meet or exceed the United States Environmental Protection Agency's revised guidelines of 30% for post-consumer and recycled content, as they were made from fiber that contains 50% post-consumer materials.

On April 30, 2008, Pendaflex announced that it achieved Sustainable Forestry Initiative (SFI Inc.) fiber sourcing certification across the United States. Fiber sourcing certification is granted when a company has verified that at least 66% of their supply comes from an SFI certified procurement operation. SFI's certification program is one of the largest in the world, with a standard based on principles and measures that promote responsible environmental behavior and sound forest management including measures to protect water quality, biodiversity, wildlife habitat, species at risk and forests of exceptional conservation value.

References

External links
Pendaflex corporate homepage

Companies based in New York (state)
Office supply companies of the United States